"Pure Grinding" is a song by Avicii, released as a single in 2015. The track appears on his album Stories and on his two-track EP Pure Grinding / For a Better Day. It was written by Tim Bergling (Avicii), Kristoffer Fogelmark, Albin Nedler and Earl Johnson. The song was previously leaked on the Internet with the title "Nothing to Lose". It is also part of the official soundtrack for the 2015 reboot of Need for Speed.

Reception
"Pure Grinding" received mixed-to-positive reviews from critics. Will Hermes of Rolling Stone described the song as "duty-free trap music cut with polyester funk", while Marcus Dowling of Insomniac noted that a "more power synth- and heavy drop-loving producer" would have benefited the song.

Music video
The music video was released September 3, 2015.
The video displays two lives of men: one man works in the sweaty heat of the desert working in a quarry pick-axing and piling stone bricks on his truck. When the man returns home he finds overdue bills, and an argumentative wife or mother which then left him. He then worked hard to pay off the overdue bills and eventually succeeded on it. The other man is a rich and criminal man. He and his gang head out and rob a gas station and even shoot and kill the owner. They next attempt to rob a bank. The men use their guns to scare the employees and hold a few against their will so they rob the safe. When the man and his partners reach the safe they start stacking their money until the alarm sounds and the men flee. As the gang escapes, one man locks the boss in the safe with the money and the video ends with the man enranged and begins to wait for his arrest.

Charts

Certifications

References

2015 songs
2015 singles
Avicii songs
Songs written by Avicii
Songs written by Kristoffer Fogelmark
Songs written by Albin Nedler